Fabrice Kah (born 9 March 1996) is a Cameroonian professional footballer who plays as a winger for Cypriot First Division club Olympiakos Nicosia.

References

1996 births
Living people
Footballers from Yaoundé
Cameroonian footballers
Cypriot First Division players
Campeonato de Portugal (league) players
Olympiakos Nicosia players
U.D. Leiria players
Association football midfielders
Cameroonian expatriate footballers
Expatriate footballers in Portugal
Cameroonian expatriate sportspeople in Portugal
Expatriate footballers in Cyprus
Cameroonian expatriate sportspeople in Cyprus